Oppenheim and St. Johnsville Union Society Church, also known as Crum Creek Evangelical Lutheran Church, is a historic Lutheran church at 110 County Highway 108 in Crum Creek, Fulton County, New York. It was built in 1853 and is a -story, rectangular frame building, three bays wide and five bays deep.  It has a polychrome slate roof, rests on a cut limestone foundation, and is clad in brick added in 1907. It  features a square, open belfry with four sawn Gothic spires. The last church service in the building was held in September 2009.

It was listed on the National Register of Historic Places in 2010.

References

External links
Crum Creek Happenings blog

Churches on the National Register of Historic Places in New York (state)
Lutheran churches in New York (state)
Churches completed in 1853
19th-century Lutheran churches in the United States
Churches in Fulton County, New York
National Register of Historic Places in Fulton County, New York